Passingham is a surname. Notable people with the surname include:
 Kenneth Passingham, British film writer, biographer and critic
 Richard Passingham (born 1943), British neuroscientist